Fraser Gore (10 July 1857 – 23 September 1914) was a Scotland international rugby union player. His regular playing position was Forward.

Rugby Union career

Amateur career

Gore played for the Wasps in 1877.

Gore then played rugby union for London Scottish. He was part of the 1883-84 side that was unbeaten by any London club.

Provincial career

Gore played for Surrey on Monday 6 December 1880, in a match against Kent. He played again for Surrey in 1882 against Middlesex.

International career

Gore was capped just the once by Scotland, against Ireland in 1882.

Military career

Gore began a private in the 15th battalion of Middlesex Regiment in 1878.

Gore was a volunteer in the Auxiliary Forces, becoming a Lieutenant in the 7th battalion of Middlesex Regiment.

In 1889, Gore was in the London Scottish Rifles.

Other sports

Rowing

Gore was named in the North London Rowing Club in 1878 and in the Thames Rowing Club in 1879. He rowed in the Thames Challenge Cup.

Wrestling

Gore won a wrestling event at the Scottish Athletic Gathering - a Highland Games event in London - at Stamford Bridge in 1888.

Family

Gore's parents were James Arthur Gore (1827-1901) and Catherine Louise Bazalgette (1832-1921). They married in 1854, and Fraser was the eldest of their 10 children.

Fraser married Mary Ohlsson (1875-1961) in Rondesbosch, South Africa in 1897.

Gore died on 23 September 1914 and was buried in Maitland Cemetery.

References

1857 births
1914 deaths
London Scottish F.C. players
Rugby union players from Highland (council area)
Scotland international rugby union players
Scottish rugby union players
Surrey RFU players
Wasps RFC players
Rugby union forwards